Shen Defu (1578–1642) was a Chinese writer and bureaucrat during the Ming Dynasty. He lived in Zhejiang.

In 1618, he achieved the rank of juren in the Imperial examinations, but failed an exam for promotion to the rank of jinshi a year later. His principal work was the Wanli ye huo bian (Miscellaneous notes of Wanli), which he completed in 1607. He was married for a time to the courtesan Xue Susu.

References

Ming dynasty historians
1578 births
1642 deaths
Historians from Beijing
17th-century Chinese historians